Westmoreland Road station is a DART Light Rail station in Dallas, Texas. It is located in the Oak Cliff neighborhood at Illinois Avenue and Westmoreland Road.

References

External links
 DART - Westmoreland Station

Dallas Area Rapid Transit light rail stations in Dallas
Railway stations in the United States opened in 1996
1996 establishments in Texas
Railway stations in Dallas County, Texas